Machete Music is an urban music label owned by Universal Music Group. The record label had been largely associated with reggaeton music, but in recent years, it has been also been signing non-reggaeton artists such as Malverde, Mala Rodriguez and Chino XL. The label is part of Universal Music Latin Entertainment. Machete Music is one of the most prevalent labels in the reggaeton genre.

According to Toy Selectah (also known as Toy Hernández, A&R of the label from 2004 to 2007), its president Gustavo López "suggested the name Machete, in part because of Control Machete, Hernández's former band". In 2010, the label launched its Machete Music Tour 2010 in celebration of the label's fifth anniversary. The label claims 80% of Latin Rhythm Billboard chart sales. In the five years between the label's establishment in 2005 and 2010, Machete has had 27 top ten albums on the Billboard Top Latin Albums chart with eleven of those being number one albums.

Artists signed on with Machete Music

AKWID
Angel & Khriz
Artwell Smart
Black Guayaba
Carlos & Alejandra
Chino & Nacho
Don Omar
DJ Kazzanova
Eddy Lover
El Roockie
Ivy Queen
Jory
J-King & Maximan
Jowell & Randy
Makano
Mach & Daddy
Ñejo & Dalmata
Poeta Callejero
Xtreme

Affiliated labels
Gold Star Music
Mas Flow Inc
Pina Records
VI Music
Drama Records
WY Records
Panama Music

Former artists on Machete Music

Wisin & Yandel
La Factoría

See also
Universal Music Group
Universal Music Latin Entertainment
Reggaeton
List of reggaeton musicians
Lists of record labels

References

External links
Official Site

2005 establishments in Puerto Rico
Record labels established in 2005
Puerto Rican record labels
Hip hop record labels
Reggaeton record labels
Universal Music Latin Entertainment
Companies based in Miami
Puerto Rican brands